Mur Lafferty (born July 25, 1973) is an American podcaster and writer based in Durham, North Carolina. She was the editor and host of Escape Pod from 2010, when she took over from Steve Eley, until 2012, when she was replaced by Norm Sherman. She is also the host and creator of the podcast I Should Be Writing. Until July 2007, she was host and co-editor of Pseudopod. She was the Editor-in-Chief of the Escape Artists short fiction magazine Mothership Zeta until it went on hiatus in 2016.

Education 
Lafferty attended the University of North Carolina at Chapel Hill and graduated with a degree in English. In 2014, she received her MFA from the University of Maine's Stonecoast program.

Podcasting

Early contributions
A friend introduced Lafferty to podcasting in October 2004. She immediately seized on the medium as a novel opportunity to publish her essays on geekdom. Her first podcast, Geek Fu Action Grip, launched in December 2004. Early topics included her obsession with Alton Brown and her uncomfortable crushes on the hosts of her child's TV shows, and expanded to discussions of games, movies, and television shows. In later episodes she began podcasting her fiction, most notably her serialized novels Heaven and Heaven Part 2: Hell. Geek Fu Action Grip ceased production as of episode 103.

Lafferty's essays also led to her becoming an early contributor to Wingin' It: a sci-fi variety show podcast hosted by Michael R. Mennenga and Evo Terra. While she is no longer a regular, her essay produced during their 2006 Dragon*Con show is considered one of her best.

In September 2006, Lafferty, along with Michael R. Mennenga and Tracy Hickman, founded the Parsec Awards, which recognize excellence in science fiction podcasting. After a general nomination period, the Steering Committee compiles a shortlist, from which an independent panel of judges selects the winner of each category. The awards are presented yearly at Dragon*Con.

I Should Be Writing

Lafferty's second podcast arose from her desire to share her experiences as a struggling fiction writer. I Should Be Writing is a self-described "podcast for wannabe fiction writers." Each show covers a specific topic about the writing world, from battling self-doubt to crafting queries and cover letters, interspersed with interviews with published professionals. I Should Be Writing won the 2007 Parsec Award for Best Writing Podcast.

Escape Pod and Pseudopod

From May 2010 to December 2012, she was the editor and host of the sci-fi podcast magazine Escape Pod, taking over from former editor and founder Steve Eley. Under her editorship, Escape Pod began paying SFWA pro rates for the first time.

Lafferty was also co-founder, along with Steve Eley and co-editor Ben Phillips, of Pseudopod, a spin-off of Escape Pod presenting "the best in audio horror." In July 2007 she stepped down as co-editor of Pseudopod.

Ditch Diggers

In January 2015, Lafferty started a new podcast with a recurring I Should Be Writing guest host Matt Wallace. The new show, titled Ditch Diggers, focuses on the professional and business side of writing and is intended to be honest to the point of brutality, in contrast to the more optimistic and uplifting tone of I Should Be Writing. It won the Hugo Award for Best Fancast in 2018, having been a finalist the year before.

Writing

Early career
Lafferty's early career began with her writing for White Wolf and other role-playing game companies, and she has expanded to writing about games for such publications as Scrye, Knights of the Dinner Table, Anime Insider, Games Quarterly, and The Escapist. Her podcast novel Playing For Keeps was published by Swarm Press on August 25, 2008.

She has also written essays for the online magazine Grumble, many of which have ended up on Geek Fu Action Grip and published fiction in Hub magazine. Her short story "1963: The Argument Against Louis Pasteur" (published in The Thackery T. Lambshead Cabinet of Curiosities) qualified her for the John W. Campbell Award for Best New Writer, which she won in 2013.

The Shambling Guides
In May 2013, Orbit Books released the first in Lafferty's urban fantasy series: The Shambling Guide to New York City. It received favorable reception; Kirkus Reviews stated: "The hip, knowing and sometimes hysterically funny narrative, interspersed with excerpts from the guide of the title, lurches along in splendid fashion… The result is irresistible."

The second novel in the series, A Ghost Train to New Orleans, was published on March 4, 2014.

Awards and honors
Member of the Podcast Pickle Hall of Fame
One of the Top Ten Savvy Women in Podcasting, 2006
Tricks of the Podcasting Masters was named one of the top reference books for 2006 by Amazon.com.
2007 Parsec Nomination for Best Speculative Fiction Story (Short Form): I Look Forward To Remembering You
2007 Parsec Award for Best Writing Related Podcast: I Should Be Writing
2008 Parsec Award for Best Speculative Fiction Story (Novella Form): Heaven – Season Four: Wasteland
2008 Parsec Award for Best Speculative Fiction Story (Long Form): Playing for Keeps
2010 Parsec Nomination for Best Speculative Fiction Story (Novella Form): Heaven – Season Five: War
2011 Parsec Nomination for Best Speculative Fiction Story (Novella Form): Marco and the Red Granny
2012 Nomination for John W. Campbell Award for Best New Writer
2013 John W. Campbell Award for Best New Writer
2018 Nomination for Hugo Award for Best SemiProzine as editor of Escape Pod

Selected bibliography

Novels 
Playing for Keeps (2007, Podiobooks.com)
Playing for Keeps (2008, Swarm Press)
Nanovor: Hacked (2010, Running Press Kids)
Six Wakes (2017, Orbit)
Solo: A Star Wars Story: Expanded Edition, (film novelization; 2018, Del Rey)
Station Eternity (2022, Ace)

The Shambling Guides 
A Shambling Guide to New York (2013, Orbit Books)
The Ghost Train to New Orleans (2014, Orbit Books)

Novellas 
Heaven - Season One (2006, Podiobooks.com)
Heaven - Season Two: Hell (2007, Podiobooks.com)
Heaven - Season Three: Earth (2007, Podiobooks.com)
Heaven - Season Four: Wasteland (2007, Podiobooks.com)
Heaven - Season Five: War (2009, Podiobooks.com)
Marco and the Red Granny (2010, Hub Magazine)

Short fiction 
"I Look Forward To Remembering You" (2006, Escape Pod)
"1963: The Argument Against Louis Pasteur", The Thackery T. Lambshead Cabinet of Curiosities (ed. Ann and Jeff VanderMeer)
"Produce 1:1-10" (2014, Daily Science Fiction)

Serial fiction 
 Bookburners (created by Max Gladstone)
 Bookburners Season One (with Gladstone, Margaret Dunlap, and Brian Francis Slattery)
 Episode 4: "A Sorcerer's Apprentice" (2015)
 Episode 8: "Under My Skin" (2015)
 Episode 11: "Shore Leave" (2015)
 Episode 13: "Keeping Friends Close" (2015)

Anthologies 
Voices: New Media Fiction (editor; 2006, Podiobooks.com)

Non-fiction and essays 
Tricks of the Podcasting Masters (with Robert Walch) Que 2006 
Lessons From a Geek Fu Master, (2006, Lulu)

RPGs 
D20 Fright Night Haunted School (2004, Hogshead Publishing)

Magazines 
Mothership Zeta (2015–2016, Escape Artists; Editor-in-Chief)

References

External links
 
 RPG writing credits
 Audio interview on the Comic Geek Speak podcast
 Interview on Books and Ideas Podcast (2008)
 
 Mur Lafferty at The Encyclopedia of Science Fiction
 Essay on story behind The Shambling Guide to New York City

Living people
1973 births
21st-century American novelists
American podcasters
American women podcasters
American science fiction writers
American women short story writers
American women novelists
Novelists from North Carolina
Women science fiction and fantasy writers
21st-century American women writers
21st-century American short story writers
University of North Carolina at Chapel Hill alumni